Alfred T. Blevins (1922 – October 22, 1988) was an American football coach.  He served as the head football coach at Central State College—now the University of Central Oklahoma—from 1958 to 1963, compiling a career college football record of 82–46–6, and two conference championships, and a national championship. He ranks first all-time for Broncho coaches in winning percentage and sixth in number of games coached and victories.

High school coaching
Blevins was the head coach at John Marshall High School in Oklahoma City, and Edmond High School in Edmond, Oklahoma.

Central State
Blevins was hired as the head coach of Central State College Bronchos men's basketball team 1957 and held that post for one season. He coached the Central Oklahoma Bronchos football team from 1958 until 1963. During that span his teams went 82–46–6, winning two Oklahoma Collegiate Conference titles, in 1961 and 19162, and the NAIA Football National Championship in 1962.

Later coaching
Blevins coached at Guthrie High School, in Guthrie, Oklahoma for four seasons. He coached the Oklahoma City Wranglers, and Oklahoma City Plainsmen.

Personal life
Blevins was married to an Mary, an English teacher and had two daughters and a son. Blevins was arrested on April 29, 1981, for reckless driving, and for possession of a controlled substance with intent to distribute. He was convicted of drug charges in 1982.

Head coaching record

College football

College basketball

References

1922 births
1988 deaths
Central Oklahoma Bronchos football coaches
Central Oklahoma Bronchos men's basketball coaches
High school football coaches in Oklahoma
American people convicted of drug offenses
American sportspeople convicted of crimes